Anita Simonis Zetts (March 2, 1926 – December 11, 2011) was an American gymnast who competed in the 1948 Summer Olympics, where she won a bronze medal. Simonis Zetts was born in New York City and competed in gymnastics throughout her life. She was also a mother to four children.

References

1926 births
2011 deaths
American gymnasts
Gymnasts at the 1948 Summer Olympics
Olympic bronze medalists for the United States in gymnastics
Medalists at the 1948 Summer Olympics